Lebercilin, also known as leber congenital amaurosis 5 (LCA5), is a protein that in humans is encoded by the LCA5 gene. This protein is thought to be involved in centrosomal or ciliary functions.

Clinical significance 

Mutations in the LCA5 gene are associated with Leber's congenital amaurosis.

References